Gebhard Büchel (born 21 June 1921) is a Liechtenstein former decathlete who competed in the 1948 Summer Olympics.

References

1921 births
Living people
Liechtenstein decathletes
Olympic athletes of Liechtenstein
Athletes (track and field) at the 1948 Summer Olympics